Naryn District (before 2004: Tyanshan District) is a district of Naryn Region in central-southern Kyrgyzstan. The administrative seat lies at the city Naryn, which is not part of the district. Naryn District was established in its borders in 1930. It borders with At-Bashy District to the south, Ak-Talaa District to the west, Kochkor District to the north, Tong District to the north-east, Jeti-Ögüz District to the east, and Lake Song Köl to the north-west.

The district is characterized by the scenic Tian Shan Mountains, alpine pastures and Lake Song Köl which during summer months attracts large herds of sheep and horses with their herders and their yurts.

Economy
The economy of Naryn oblast is dominated by animal herding (sheep, horses, yaks), with wool and meat as the main products.  Mining of various minerals developed during the Soviet era has largely been abandoned as uneconomical. Today the area is considered to be the poorest region in the country.

Demographics

According to the 2009 Census, the ethnic composition (de jure population) of the Naryn District was 99.8% Kyrgyz and 0.2% other groups.

Populated places
In total, Naryn District includes 39 settlements in 15 rural communities. The rural communities and settlements in the Naryn District are:

 Ak-Kuduk (seat: Segizinchi Mart; incl. Ak-Kuduk and Shoro)
 Chet-Nura (seat: Orto-Nura; incl. Ak-Bulung, Ak-Kyya, Iyri-Suu, Orto-Saz, Örük-Tam (part), Chet-Nura and Tösh-Bulak)
 Döbölü (seat: Döbölü; incl. Alysh and Kengesh)
 Dostuk (seat: Dostuk)
 Emgekchil (seat: Emgekchil)
 Emgek-Talaa (seat: Ak-Talaa; incl. Tegerek and Emgek-Talaa)
 Jan-Bulak (seat: Jan-Bulak)
 Jerge-Tal (seat: Jerge-Tal; incl. Jalgyz-Terek and Kyzyl-Jyldyz)
 Kara-Kujur (seat: Lakol; incl. Jer-Köchkü)
 Kazan-Kuygan (seat: Kazan-Kuygan; incl. Kara-Üngkür)
 Ming-Bulak (seat: Kuybyshev; incl. Ming-Bulak and Örnök)
 On-Archa (seat: Echki-Bashy; incl. Ottuk)
 Ortok (seat: Tash-Bashat, incl. Kayyngdy, Örük-Tam, Eki-Naryn and Tamdy-Suu)
 Sary-Oy (seat: Jylan-Aryk; incl. Sary-Oy)
 Uchkun (seat: Kulanak; incl. Uchkun)

References 

Districts of Naryn Region